Churu Pata (Aymara churu a small waru waru; a lump, pata stone bench, step, also spelled Choro Pata) is a mountain in the Andes of Bolivia which reaches a height of approximately . It is located in the La Paz Department, Murillo Province, La Paz Municipality. Churu Pata lies northwest of Chuqi Tanka and northeast of Ch'uñawi.

References 

Mountains of La Paz Department (Bolivia)